Towheads is a 2013 drama film directed by Shannon Plumb and starring Shannon Plumb, Derek Cianfrance, and Lora Lee Gayer.

Plot

Cast
 Shannon Plumb as Penelope
 Derek Cianfrance as Matt
 Cody Cianfrance as Cody
 Walker Cianfrance as Walker
 Lora Lee Gayer as Lily
 Yinka Adeboyeku as Construction Worker #1
 Michael Massimino as Construction Worker #2

Reception
At Metacritic, the film had mixed or average reviews with 56 out of 100 based on five critics.

Andrew Schenker of Slant Magazine gave the film a half star, noting that the film was "so tone deaf, unfunny, and generally wrongheaded".

External links

References

2013 drama films
2013 films
American drama films
2010s English-language films
2010s American films